David Liu (born August 12, 1965) is a Taiwanese former competitive figure skater. He won silver medals at the 1991 Piruetten and 1992 Grand Prix International St. Gervais. He represented Taiwan at three Olympics, reaching the free skate at the 1992 Winter Olympics in Albertville, where he finished 17th.

Early life 
Liu was born on August 12, 1965 in Taipei, Taiwan. He moved to the United States when he was six years old.

Career

Competitive 
Liu began skating in 1973. At the 1990 World Championships, he became the last male skater to perform a compulsory figure in a major ISU event before they were discontinued.

Liu made his first Olympic appearance at the 1988 Winter Olympics in Calgary, Alberta, Canada. Ranked 25th in the compulsory figures and 23rd in the short program, he missed the cut-off for the free skate by one spot. He reached the final segment at the 1992 Winter Olympics in Albertville, France, placing 17th in the short program, 19th in the free skate, and 17th overall.

Liu did not compete at the 1994 Winter Olympics in Lillehammer, Norway. In March, he qualified for the free skate at the 1994 World Championships in Chiba, Japan, and finished 21st overall (9th in his qualifying group, 23rd in the short, 20th in the free).
 
Liu placed 27th in the short program at the 1998 Winter Olympics in Nagano, Japan. He retired from eligible competition at the end of the season. During his career, he was coached by Toller Cranston and Sonya Dunfield.

Later career 
Liu formerly worked as a choreographer and co-director for the Ice Theatre of New York. Since 1990, he has performed and choreographed for numerous ballet companies around the world including major companies in Japan, Taiwan, Singapore, Hong Kong, Germany and the United Kingdom. He has directed and choreographed major ice show presentations in China at the grand opening of the World Ice Arena Shenzhen in 2005 and the new World Ice Arena Hangzhou in 2010. Liu co-directs and produces ice shows with his business partner Darren Olivero of Solidwater Productions based in New York and Hong Kong.

Liu is involved in both television and dance programs in Hong Kong.

Programs

Results

References

External links
 Official site

Olympic figure skaters of Taiwan
Figure skaters at the 1998 Winter Olympics
Figure skaters at the 1992 Winter Olympics
Figure skaters at the 1988 Winter Olympics
Taiwanese male single skaters
Figure skaters at the 1999 Asian Winter Games
1965 births
Living people